Exaprolol is a beta-adrenoceptor antagonist.

Synthesis

References

Beta blockers
N-isopropyl-phenoxypropanolamines
Cyclohexyl compounds